Rokh (رخ) may refer to:

Geography
Jolgeh Rokh District (Persian: بخش جلگه رخ)

People
Shah Rokh (Persian: شاهرخ) (c. 1730–1796), Persian ruler of India

Games
Rokh (video game), upcoming science fiction video game
 Rook (chess) from Persian  رخ (transliterated rokh or rukh)

See also
Rukh (disambiguation) (Persian روخ)